Fraxinus albicans, commonly called the Texas ash, is a species of tree in the olive family (Oleaceae). It is native to North America, where it is found from  eastern Texas and southern Oklahoma in the United States, to the state of Durango in Mexico. Its natural habitat is in dry, rocky slopes, often over limestone.

Description
It is a small deciduous tree growing to 10 m tall, with a trunk up to 30 cm diameter. The leaves are 13–20 cm long, pinnately compound with usually five rounded leaflets 3–7.5 cm long and 2–5 cm broad. The flowers are purple, produced in small clusters in early spring; like all ashes, the Texas ash is dioecious, with male and female flowers on separate trees. The fruit is a samara 1.5–3 cm long, with an apical wing. It is long-lived and drought tolerant.

Like other species in the section Melioides, Fraxinus albicans is dioecious, with male and female flowers produced on separate individuals.

Taxonomy
Fraxinus albicans is closely related to Fraxinus americana (white ash), and is sometimes treated as a variety of it. Where they co-occur, Fraxinus albicans is found in dry habitats while Fraxinus americana is found in mesic bottoms. Fraxinus albicans  can be morphologically distinguished by its smaller leaves, smaller and more rounded leaflets, and smaller samaras.

References

albicans
Flora of Oklahoma
Flora of Texas
Dioecious plants
Flora without expected TNC conservation status